The Thomas Ligotti Reader: Essays and Explorations is a collection of essays on American horror writer Thomas Ligotti and his works, edited by Darrell Schweitzer. It was first published in trade paperback in April 2003 by Wildside Press, with a hardcover edition from the same publisher following in July of the same year.

The book consists of thirteen essays by various authors, including one by Ligotti himself, together with a bibliography of Ligotti's published works.

Contents
"Thomas Ligotti's Career of Nightmares" (Matt Cardin)
"Weird Tales Talks with Thomas Ligotti" (Darrell Schweitzer)
"The Mystagogue, the Gnostic Quest, the Secret Book" (Robert M. Price)
"Nothing is What it Seems to Be" (Stefan R. Dziemianowicz)
"Disillusionment can be Glamorous: an Interview with Thomas Ligotti" (E.M. Angerhuber and Thomas Wagner)
"The Transition from Literary Horror to Existential Nightmare in Thomas Ligotti's 'Nethescurial'" (Matt Cardin)
"The Dark Beauty of Unheard of Horrors" (Thomas Ligotti)
"Liminal Terror and Collective Identity in Thomas Ligotti's 'The Shadow at the Bottom of the World'" (Matt Cardin)
"Twilight Twilight Nihil Nihil: Thomas Ligotti and the Post-Industrial English Underground" (William Burns)
"Soft Black Star: Some Thoughts on Knowing Thomas Ligotti" (David Tibet)
"The Dream Quest of Thomas Ligotti: a Study of 'In a Foreign Town, in a Foreign Land'" (Ben P. Indick)
"Ligotti's Corporate Horror" (Darrell Schweitzer)
"Thomas Ligotti: Escape from Life" (S.T. Joshi)
"A Thomas Ligotti Bibliography" (Douglas Anderson)

External links

Entry at Wildside Press

Thomas Ligotti
2003 non-fiction books
2003 anthologies
Books by Darrell Schweitzer
Books of literary criticism
Books about writers
Essay anthologies
Essays about literature
Wildside Press books